Xiphilinus may  refer to:

 John VIII of Constantinople (c. 1010–1075), a Byzantine intellectual and the 104th Patriarch of Constantinople
 John Xiphilinus (late 11th century AD), a Byzantine historian and the nephew of Patriarch John VIII of Constantinople